Dušan Zbavitel (7 May 1925 – 7 August 2012) was a Czech indologist.

Life
Dušan Zbavitel studied Indology with Professor Vincenc Lesný at Charles University in Prague in 1945–1948. After defending his CSc (Candidate of Sciences) dissertation in Bengali literature (1954), he started as a researcher at the Oriental Institute of the Czechoslovak Academy of Sciences. He remained there until being forced out for political reasons in 1971 during the period of Communist "normalization" that followed the Soviet-led invasion of Czechoslovakia in 1968. After 1971, he worked as a freelance translator, and in 1978 he started as a teacher of Sanskrit and Bengali at the School of Languages in Prague. He was active as an author and translator until the last days of his life. He translated from Sanskrit, Pali, Bengali, English and German.

Literary oeuvre
Zbavitel specialized in Bengali literature, winning international acclaim in this field. His most quoted literary works include a study of East Bengal folk ballads (Bengali Folk Ballads from Mymensingh and the Question of their Authenticity) and a comprehensive history of Bengali literature ("Bengali Literature") published in 1976 in the prestigious publication History of Indian Literature edited by Jan Gonda. In addition to these monographs, the international research community has praised Zbavitel's numerous magazine articles (of which he wrote more than 100) such as a series of papers on Rabindranath Tagore, the beginnings of modern Bengali drama and studies of baromasi, a specific genre of medieval and folk Bengali literature. Zbavitel's prominence in this field is highlighted by his appointment first as a team member for the project The Dictionary of Oriental Literature and then as editor-in-chief of its second volume devoted to south Asian literature, which was published in London in 1974.

Zbavitel is the Czech Republic’s best known Indologist. He published a prolific amount despite being out of favor with Czechoslovakia's totalitarian regime. He authored or co-authored many specialized and popular books and initiated and edited a great number of collective works that still represent the best of Czech Indology. Zbavitel left an indelible trace on Czech culture with his erudite translations from the languages of India, amounting to dozens of books and countless magazine and journal contributions.

Zbavitel educated several generations of Czech Indologists. While still just a researcher at the Oriental Institute of the Czechoslovak Academy of Sciences, he taught Bengali at the Faculty of Arts, Charles University (1950–1968). He was not permitted to continue for political reasons after 1968, and was only able to return after the fall of the Communist regime (1989). In 1990, he rejoined the faculty, teaching the history of Sanskrit and Bengali literature, ancient Indian poetry and Hinduism and leading courses in the advanced reading of Sanskrit and Bengali texts. He also authored language textbooks and other pedagogical texts.

Zbavitel also translated from English and German. In total, he wrote or translated over 200 books, among others: Paul Williams and Anthony Tribe, Buddhist Thought: A Complete Introduction to the Indian Tradition; Michael Jordan, Buddha; Deepak Chopra, Buddha: A Story of Enlightenment; Tom Lowenstein, The Vision of Buddha; Hans Küng and Heinrich von Stietencron, Christendum und Weltreligionen - Hinduismus; Hans Küng and Heinrich Bechert, Christendum und Weltreligionen - Buddhismus; Dalai Lama, The Collected Statements, Articles and Interviews of His Holiness The XIV Dalai Lama; Dalai Lama, How to Expand Love; Dalai Lama, Many Ways to Nirvana; Dalai Lama, How To Practice the Way to a Meaningful Life; John Powers, Introduction to Tibetan Buddhism; Michael Keene, World Religions; Sogyal Rinpoche, The Tibetan Book of Living and Dying; J. R. Porter, Jesus Christ, The Jesus of History, The Christ of Faith; Jacob Newman and Gavriel Sivan, Judaism A-Z Illustrated: Lexicon of Terms & Concepts.

Awards and honors
Zbavitel received many awards at home and in India for his research and translations. He received the Tagore Memorial Award from the Government of West Bengal for his History of Bengali Literature in 1977, the title Lokaratna for his contribution to folklore research (1981) and the Rabindratattvacharya award for his studies on Rabindranath Tagore (1987). In 2006, he received India's third highest civilian award, the Padma Bhushan, for his lifetime achievements. His Czech and Czechoslovak awards included the State Award for Translated Work in 2004.

International and Czech Bengalists together published a special edition of the journal Archiv Orientální on the occasion of Zbavitel's 75th birthday.

Selected bibliography

Monographs 
 Oriental Studies in Czechoslovakia. Prague: Orbis, 1959. Also translated into German, French and Russian..
 Rabíndranáth Thákur: Vývoj básníka. Praha: Orbis, 1961.
 Bengali Folk-Ballads from Mymensingh and the Problem of their Authenticity. Calcutta: University of Calcutta, 1963.
 Non-Finite Verbal Forms in Bengali. Prague: Academia, 1970.
 Bangladéš: Stát, který se musel zrodit. Prague: ČTK, Pressfoto, 1973.
 Bengali Literature. Wiesbaden: Harrassowitz, 1976.
 Jedno horké indické léto. Praha: Panorama, 1982. Translated into Russian as: . Moscow: Nauka, 1986.
 Starověká Indie. Praha: Panorama, 1985.
 Hinduismus a jeho cesty k dokonalosti. Praha: DharmaGaia, 1993. .
 Otazníky starověké Indie. Praha: Nakladatelství Lidové noviny, 1997. .
 Bengálská literatura: Od tantrických písní k Rabíndranáthu Thákurovi. Praha: ExOriente, 2008. .

Collective works 
 Pohádka o písni a jiné indické povídky. Praha: SNKL, 1953.
 DZ, Erich Herold a Kamil Zvelebil. Indie zblízka. Praha: Orbis, 1960.
 DZ a Jan Marek. Dvakrát Pákistán. Praha: Orbis, 1964. Translated into German as: Zweimal Pakistan. Leipzig: Brockhaus, 1966. Translated into Russian as: Dva Pakistana. Moscow: Nauka, 1966.
 Bozi, bráhmani, lidé: Čtyři tisíciletí hinduismu. Praha: Nakladatelství Československé akademie věd, 1964. Translated into Russian as: . Moscow: Nauka, 1969.
 Slovník spisovatelů Asie a Afriky. Praha: Odeon, 1967.
 Moudrost a umění starých Indů. Praha: Odeon, 1971.
 Dictionary of Oriental Literatures. Vol. 2: South and South-East Asia. London: Allen and Unwin, 1973.
 Setkání a proměny. Praha: Odeon, 1976. Translated into Polish as: Spotkania i przemiany. Warsaw: Panstwo wydav., 1983
 Bohové s lotosovýma očima: Hinduistické mýty v indické literatuře tří tisíciletí. Praha: Vyšehrad, 1986. 2nd ed. 1997. .
 DZ a Dana Kalvodová. Pod praporem krále nebes: Divadlo v Indii. Praha: Odeon, 1987.
 DZ a Jaroslav Vacek. Průvodce dějinami staroindické literatury. Třebíč: Arca JiMfa, 1996. .
 DZ, Miloslav Krása, Dagmar Marková. Indie a Indové: Od dávnověku k dnešku. Praha: Vyšehrad, 1997. .
 Základní texty východních náboženství. Sv. 1: Hinduismus. Praha: Argo, 2007. .
 Základní texty východních náboženství. Sv. 2: Raný indický buddhismus. Praha: Argo, 2008. .

Textbooks 
 Učebnice bengálštiny. Praha: Nakladatelství Československé akademie věd, 1953.
 Lehrbuch des Bengalischen. Heidelberg: J. Groos, 1970. 2nd ed. 1989, 3rd ed. 1996. .
 Bengálština. Praha: SPN, 1971.
 Sanskrt. Brno: UJEP, 1987.
 DZ a Jaroslav Strnad. . Praha: Karolinum, 2006. . (Revised and expanded textbook of 1987.), 2nd rev. ed. 2012.

Translations from Bengali 
 Odpor: Výbor z povídek mladých bengálských autorů. Praha: Československý spisovatel, 1951.
 Bhattáčárja, Sukánta. Písně hladu a revoluce. Praha: Mladá fronta, 1953.
 Thákur, Rabíndranáth. Pouť za člověkem. Praha: SNKLHU, 1954.
 Bandjopádhjáj, Mánik. Plavec na řece Padmě. Praha: Československý spisovatel, 1954.
 Bengálské milostné balady. Praha: SNKLHU, 1956. Translated into German as: Bengalische Balladen. Leipzig: Insel-Verlag, 1977.
 Thákur, Rabíndranáth. Básně a veršovaná dramata. Praha: Státní nakladatelství krásné literatury, hudby a umění, 1958. (Spisy Rabíndranatha Thákura, sv. 1. - The Rabindranath Tagore Collected Works, vol. 1)
 Thákur, Rabíndranáth. Gora. Dvě sestry. Praha: SNKLHU, 1959 (Spisy Rabíndranatha Thákura, sv. 2. - The Rabindranath Tagore Collected Works, vol. 2)
 Thákur, Rabíndranáth. Povídky, essaye a projevy. Praha: SNKLHU, 1960. (Spisy Rabíndranatha Thákura, sv. 3. - The Rabindranath Tagore Collected Works, vol. 3)
 Thákur, Rabíndranáth. Poslední báseň. Praha: SNKLU, 1961. 2nd ed.: Praha: Vyšehrad, 2000. .
 Ishák, Ábu. Začarovaný dům. Praha: SNKLU, 1962.
 Thákur, Rabíndranáth. Země karet. Praha: NČVU, 1962.
 Bandjopádhjáj, Mánik. Tanec loutek. Praha: SNKLU, 1964.
 Gangopádhjáj, Narájan. Vzdušné zámky. Praha: Odeon, 1967.
 Thákur, Rabíndranáth. Gítáňdžali. Praha: Supraphon, 1973.
 Valíulláh, Said. Strom bez kořenů. Praha: Odeon, 1974.
 Thákur, Rabíndranáth. Muž a žena. Praha: Odeon, 1976.  2nd ed.: Praha: Vyšehrad, 2000. .
 Bandjopádhjáj, Bibhútibhúšan. Píseň o cestě. Praha: Mladá fronta, 1978. 2nd rev. and enl. ed.: Praha: ExOriente, 2010. .
 Basu, Samareš. Pouť za nektarem nesmrtelnosti. Praha: Odeon, 1982.
 Thákur, Rabíndranáth. Na břehu řeky Zapomnění. Praha: BB/art, 2005. 
 Šankar. Lidská džungle. Praha: ExOriente, 2011. .

Translations from Sanskrit and Pali 
 Sómadéva. Oceán příběhů. 2 sv. Praha: Odeon, 1981.
 Rámájana. Praha: Argo, 2000. . 2nd ed. 2015. .
 Kautiljova Arthašástra, aneb, Učebnice věcí světských. Praha: Arista, 2001. .
 Upanišady. Praha: DharmaGaia, 2004. .
 O copatých mniších, šibalech a nevěrných manželkách: příběhy ze staré Indie. Praha: Knižní klub, 2007. .
 Džátaky: Příběhy z minulých životů Buddhy. 2nd enl. ed. Praha: DharmaGaia, 2007. .
 Mánavadharmašástra, aneb, Manuovo ponaučení o dharmě. Praha: ExOriente, 2009. .

References

References

General references 
 ONDRAČKA, Lubomír. "O autorovi". In Dušan Zbavitel: Bengálská literatura: Od tantrických písní k Rabíndranáthu Thákurovi. Praha: ExOriente, 2008, pp. 341–343, .
 ONDRAČKA, Lubomír. „Dušan Zbavitel a jeho Rámájana.“ In Dušan Zbavitel: Rámájana. Praha: Argo, 2015, s. 183–187. .
 PREINHAELTEROVÁ, Hana. "Dušan Zbavitel celebrates his 70th birthday". Archiv Orientální vol. 63, no. 3 (1995), pp. 364–367. (includes Zbavitel's bibliography until 1994.)
 PREINHAELTEROVÁ, Hana. "Dušan Zbavitel sedmdesátiletý". Nový Orient vol. 50, no. 2, (1995), pp. 237–238.
 VRŽDIAK, Radovan. "Up-to-date Bibliography of Dušan Zbavitel". Archiv Orientální vol. 68, no. 3 (2000), pp. 535–536. (includes amended bibliography 1995–1999.)

External links
 Dušan Zbavitel on the website of Obec překladatelů (Union of Translators) 
 Dušan Zbavitel in Kdo byl kdo: Čeští a slovenští orientalisté, afrikanisté a iberoamerikanisté (Who was Who: Czech and Slovak Orientalists, Afrikanists and Iberoamericanists) 

1925 births
2012 deaths
Czech male writers
Czech Indologists
Linguists from the Czech Republic
Recipients of the Padma Bhushan in literature & education
Recipients of the Rabindra Puraskar
Charles University alumni